ConsenSys is a private blockchain software technology company founded by Joseph Lubin and based in New York City.

History 
Joseph Lubin founded ConsenSys in early 2015 as a software foundry to develop decentralized software services and applications that operate on the Ethereum blockchain. On October 31, 2018, ConsenSys acquired Planetary Resources, an asteroid mining company. In December 2018, ConsenSys announced a restructuring with projected layoffs of thirteen percent of its 1,200 staff, and in February 2020 announced the layoffs of a further 14% of staff. In August 2020, ConsenSys acquired banking blockchain platform Quorum from JPMorgan Chase & Co. Financial terms of the deal were not disclosed. In November 2021, ConsenSys raised $200 million at $3.2 billion valuation from Animoca Brands, Coinbase Ventures and HSBC among others. In March 2022, ConsenSys raised $450 million in a new round led by ParaFi Capital, with Microsoft, SoftBank, and Temasek also joining as new investors in the company.

Projects 
ConsenSys is involved in many different projects and services for blockchain uses and applications.

MetaMask is an Ethereum wallet application which allows users to store and transfer cryptocurrencies and tokens, as well as access and interact with decentralized applications built on the Ethereum blockchain. The software is free to use on desktop as a browser extension or through its mobile app. 

Infura is a blockchain node infrastructure service that allows apps and developers to get data from, and broadcast transactions to, the Ethereum blockchain. Infura's network is  utilized as a backend for Ethereum services and applications, including MetaMask and many others not associated with ConsenSys. 

The company has started or invested in several different projects that are not considered to be core to their business, have been spun out into more independent entities, or are not wholly owned by ConsenSys. Some of these include Meridio, a platform used to create, manage, and trade fractional-share ownership in real estate assets, and Gnosis Safe, a platform for managing digital assets securely on ethereum.

ICOs 
Several ConsenSys companies and projects have raised capital from the public in the form of initial coin offerings (ICOs).  Gnosis, a ConsenSys-backed prediction market project sold GNO tokens to the public in an ICO in April 2017. The company raised $12.5 million at $300 million valuation, completing its ICO in under 12 minutes. The valuation was criticized by several prominent members of the community.   
Grid+, a ConsenSys company in the electricity distribution niche sold GRID tokens to the public in an ICO in September 2017. The company raised $29 million in the public token sale. 

Civil Media, a ConsenSys-backed company that claims to use cryptocurrency to save journalism sold CVL tokens to the public in an ICO in October 2018. Civil was able to raise $1.8 million, less than the $8 million soft cap. 

It was later revealed that ConsenSys was the largest buyer of CVL tokens, buying 80% of the CVL tokens that went on sale.

Virtue Poker is a ConsenSys-incubated company that uses the unique features of blockchain technology, in conjunction with peer-to-peer networking, to provide a safe and honest environment in which to play online poker. They raised 18 million dollars in the 2018 ico boom.

Controversies 
Consensys has been involved in multiple controversies and lawsuits. These include a High Court challenge in Ireland against the ruling of the Workplace Relations Commission. Separately, the 2020 sale of Metamask and other assets from its Swiss parent company to its US entity has been litigated over alleged irregularities in corporate governance.

References

External links 
 

Blockchain entities
Companies based in Brooklyn
Ethereum
Software companies based in New York City